David Stobbie Cochrane (born 30 January 1910, date of death unknown) was a Scottish professional footballer who played as a centre forward. Born in Dunblane, he started his career with Dunblane Rovers before moving to Denny Hibernian in 1927. After scoring 16 goals in the first three months of the 1927–28 season, Cochrane was signed by Football League Third Division North club Nelson. He made his debut for the club on 12 November 1927, and scored a consolation goal in the 1–9 defeat away at Bradford City, Nelson's heaviest ever defeat in the Football League. Cochrane scored again a week later in the 3–2 win over Halifax Town. He made his final first-team appearance for Nelson on 26 November 1927 in the 0–3 defeat to Bradford Park Avenue in the First Round of the FA Cup.

Cochrane failed to settle in England and a transfer to Scottish Football League First Division outfit Bo'ness followed in January 1928. He played there for two months before moving to Second Division side Armadale.

References

1910 births
Year of death missing
Scottish footballers
Association football forwards
Denny Hibernian F.C. players
Nelson F.C. players
Bo'ness F.C. players
Armadale F.C. players
English Football League players
Scottish Football League players
Sportspeople from Dunblane
Footballers from Stirling (council area)